The 33rd RTHK Top 10 Gold Songs Awards was held on January 7, 2011 for the 2010 music season.

Top 10 song awards
The top 10 songs (十大中文金曲) of 2010 are as follows.

Other awards

References
 RTHK top 10 gold song awards 2010
 Taikung news RTHK top 10 gold song awards 2011

RTHK Top 10 Gold Songs Awards
Rthk Top 10 Gold Songs Awards, 2010
2011 in Hong Kong
2011 music awards